Freeborn Township is a township in Dunklin County, in the U.S. state of Missouri.

Freeborn Township was established in 1845.

References

Townships in Missouri
Townships in Dunklin County, Missouri